Jhanga Bangial is a town in the Islamabad Capital Territory of Pakistan. It is located at 33° 17' 35N 73° 23' 45E with an altitude of 458 metres (1505 feet).

The village is named after the Rana Jahanzeib tribe, who make up the majority of the population.

References 

Union councils of Islamabad Capital Territory